The National Herbarium at Peradeniya, near Kandy in the Central province of Sri Lanka, was started in about 1821 by Alexander Moon, who was the director of the Botanical Gardens there.

References

Sri Lanka
1821 establishments in Ceylon